Kartalay (Kaitag: Кьваӏрталай; Dargwa: Кьярталай) is a rural locality (a selo) in Karatsansky Selsoviet, Kaytagsky District, Republic of Dagestan, Russia. The population was 601 as of 2010. There are 6 streets.

Geography 
Kartalay is located 9 km southeast of Madzhalis (the district's administrative centre) by road. Karatsan and Dzhinabi are the nearest rural localities.

Nationalities 
Dargins live there.

References 

Rural localities in Kaytagsky District